The Sub-Editor's Room is a 1956 Australian television play. It was produced and written by Leslie Rees. It was the first Australian-written television drama to air on Australian television.

The word "slut" was spoken in dialogue several times.

No copy of the production exists but a copy of the script survives at the National Archives of Australia.

Original play
It was based on a one act play Rees wrote in 1937.

See also
List of live television plays broadcast on Australian Broadcasting Corporation (1950s)

References

External links
The Sub-editor's Room at AustLit
Copy of set design at ABC Gore Hill Tribute Site
Australian Theatre performance of Sub-Editor's Room at Ausstage

Australian television plays
Australian Broadcasting Corporation original programming
English-language television shows
Black-and-white Australian television shows
Australian live television shows
1956 television plays